Gurudwara Nanaklama is a historical place situated in Chungthang.

History
In 1969 Asaam rifles with the help of tasa tangey lepcha the then MLA of the region built a small gurudwara, now management the gurudwara path rattan baba harbans singh ji baba bachan singh ji baba surinder singh ji dera kar sewa gurudwara bangla sahib gurudwara built near Chungthang, Sikkim by members of the Assam Rifles Battalion under Subedar Major Bhullar.

References

Religious buildings and structures in Sikkim
Gurdwaras in India